Renato Ulrich (born December 14, 1983 in Lucerne) is a Swiss freestyle skier, specializing in  aerials.

Ulrich competed at the 2006 and 2010 Winter Olympics for Switzerland. In 2006, he advanced to the aerials final, finishing in 10th. In 2010, he placed 18th in the qualifying round of the aerials event, failing to advance to the final.

As of March 2013, his best showing at the World Championships is 4th, in both 2009 and 2011.

Ulrich made his World Cup debut in January 2003. As of March 2013, he has finished on the podium five times, with the best silver medals, in 2010/11 and 2011/12. His best World Cup overall finish in aerials is 3rd, in 2010/11.

World Cup Podiums

References

1983 births
Living people
Olympic freestyle skiers of Switzerland
Freestyle skiers at the 2010 Winter Olympics
Freestyle skiers at the 2014 Winter Olympics
Sportspeople from Lucerne
Swiss male freestyle skiers
21st-century Swiss people